Carisbrooke is a village on the south western outskirts of Newport, Isle of Wight and is best known as the site of Carisbrooke Castle. It also has a medieval parish church. St Mary's Church (overlooking Carisbrooke High Street with views to the castle),  began life as part of a Benedictine priory, established by French monks about 1150. The priory was dissolved by King Henry V of England in 1415 during the French Wars. Neglect over the centuries took its toll, but in 1907 the church was restored to its full glory. Its most striking feature is the 14th century tower, rising in five stages with a turret at one corner and a battlemented and pinnacled crown.

There is a Roman Villa discovered in the Victorian era on the site of the old vicarage.

Transport
It is served by Southern Vectis buses operating to Freshwater, Newport, Yarmouth and Ventnor, as well as some smaller villages. It was served by nearby Carisbrooke railway station until it closed in 1953. It is the starting point of the Tennyson Trail, leading to Alum Bay.

Local Amenities

It has two pubs - the Waverley and the Eight Bells, a café, an Italian restaurant and a motorcycle dealership. There are several shops on the High Street. The village has four schools, three of which are along Wellington Road. These are Carisbrooke CE Primary School, Christ the King College (formerly Archbishop King Roman Catholic Middle and Trinity CE Middle Schools) and Carisbrooke College. The fourth school is St Thomas of Canterbury Roman Catholic Primary School, which is on Carisbrooke High Street next to the doctors surgery. There are allotments, next to the ford in Castle Street.

History

Carisbrooke was for centuries the island 's capital and was once called Buccombe or Beaucombe, and means the ' fair valley'.

The Governor of Newport once lived at Landscape House, at the upper part of Carisbrooke High Street in the Victorian era.
Alexander Ross, prolific Scottish writer and controversialist, was vicar of Carisbrooke from 1634 until his death in 1654.

The site of the old Carisbrooke railway station lies on the grounds of Christ the King College in the lower part of the field, which is at the end of Purdy Road. The bank is all that remains of the old line.

When in 1917 the British royal family changed its name from the "House of Saxe-Coburg-Gotha" to the "House of Windsor" and renounced all German titles, the title of Marquess of Carisbrooke was created for the erstwhile German Prince Alexander of Battenberg.

Carisbrooke Castle

Carisbrooke Castle was originally a Roman fort. The castle is at the top of Castle Hill. It was built soon after William the Conqueror came to England. The William FitzOsbern, 1st Earl of Hereford may have been responsible for its construction, but he was killed in battle during 1071 and so would have had little opportunity to oversee the construction. Osbern's son, Roger, is more likely to have built or refortified the castle. It was at Carisbrooke Castle that William arrested his own half brother, Odo for acts of treason.

King Henry I of England granted the castle in the first year of his reign to Richard de Redvers. The Redvers family owned the castle for much of the Medieval period, only ending in November 1293 when the last Redvers, Isabel died. In 1136, Baldwin de Redvers took refuge in the castle on the run from King Stephen of England. The wells on the island ran dry and Baldwin gave up the land in exchange for his head. Baldwin's land was restored to him in 1153 when Henry II became king. Baldwin, the last male in the line, died in 1216 poisoned, it is said by Peter II of Savoy. Isabella de Fortibus, Baldwin's sister took control of the castle and successfully ran it until her death in 1293. After the death of Isabella de Fortibus in 1293 the castle became the property of Edward I and the crown.

In 1355 Edward III granted the ownership of the castle to his daughter Isabel. In 1377 The French landed on the Isle of Wight and attacked Carisbrooke castle. The castle did not fall to the French. Later in 1647 Charles I took refuge at Carisbrooke but the castle later turned out to be his prison from where he attempted several times to escape but failed. His daughter princess Elizabeth later died there aged 14.

It later became the royal residence of Princess Beatrice the 9th daughter of Queen Victoria who put in the gardens which have been recently restored.  She established the museum in the centre of the bailey.

Cultural references
Carisbrooke appears as "Chalkburne" in the 1886 novel The Silence of Dean Maitland by Maxwell Gray.

References

External links
Carisbrooke Church from Blacks Guide to the Isle of Wight, 1870
Carisbrooke Priory website

Villages on the Isle of Wight
Burial sites of the Seymour family
Former civil parishes in the Isle of Wight